Zaman Put (also Romanized as Zamān Pūţ; also known as Azmān Pūţ) is a village in Dughayi Rural District, in the Central District of Quchan County, Razavi Khorasan Province, Iran. At the 2006 census, its population was 116, in 30 families.

References 

Populated places in Quchan County